Antron or Antrones (Ἀντρῶνες) was a town and polis (city-state) of ancient Thessaly in the district Achaea Phthiotis, at the entrance of the Maliac Gulf, and opposite Oreus in Euboea. It is mentioned in the Catalogue of Ships in the Iliad as one of the cities of Protesilaus, and also in the Homeric hymn to Demeter as under the protection of that goddess. It was purchased by Philip II of Macedon, and was taken by the Romans in their war with Perseus of Macedon. It probably owed its long existence to the composition of its rocks, which furnished some of the best millstones in Greece; hence the epithet of πετρήεις ("maritime") given to it in the hymn to Demeter. Off Antron was a sunken rock (ἕρμα ὔφαλον) called the Ὄνος Ἀντρῶνος, or mill-stone of Antron.

Modern scholars identify the location of Antron with the modern village of Glyfa.

References

Populated places in ancient Thessaly
Former populated places in Greece
Locations in the Iliad
Achaea Phthiotis
Thessalian city-states